Per-Olof Edfeldt (1 November 1914 – 16 June 1988) was a Swedish sprinter. He competed in the men's 4 × 400 metres relay at the 1936 Summer Olympics.

References

1914 births
1988 deaths
Athletes (track and field) at the 1936 Summer Olympics
Swedish male sprinters
Olympic athletes of Sweden
Place of birth missing
20th-century Swedish people